Frederick Behlmer Carisch (November 14, 1881 – April 19, 1977) was a Major League Baseball (MLB) catcher who played for eight seasons. He played for the Pittsburgh Pirates from 1903 to 1906, the Cleveland Naps from 1912 to 1914, and the Detroit Tigers in 1923.

His one-off appearance for the Tigers occurred on July 4, 1923, against the Cleveland Indians. In the tenth inning, Larry Woodall, the only remaining catcher on the Tigers, was ejected from the game. When Indians manager Tris Speaker refused to let any of the other catchers reenter the game, Tigers manager Ty Cobb was forced to use 41-year-old Carisch, who was one of the Detroit coaches. Speaker had protested the game since Carisch was not on the eligible list, but the Indians won in the bottom of the inning.

References

External links

1881 births
1977 deaths
Baseball players from Wisconsin
Burials at Rose Hills Memorial Park
Cleveland Naps players
Columbus Senators players
Detroit Tigers coaches
Detroit Tigers players
Helena Senators players
Indianapolis Indians players
Jersey City Skeeters players
Major League Baseball catchers
Major League Baseball first basemen
Minor league baseball managers
Newark Indians players
People from Fountain City, Wisconsin
Pittsburgh Pirates players
Portland Beavers players
Rochester Bronchos players
Sioux Falls Canaries managers
Sioux Falls Canaries players
Sioux Falls Soos players
St. Paul Saints (AA) players
St. Paul Saints (Western League) players
Toledo Mud Hens players